Tim McKernan may refer to:

 Tim McKernan, a.k.a. Barrel Man (Denver Broncos) (1940–2009), the Denver Broncos superfan known as "Barrel Man"
 Timothy McKernan (b. 1989), American ice dancer